The history of pornography in Hungary mainly dates from the period after the fall of communism in 1989. The production and distribution of pornography was illegal under their Socialist system, but the laws were liberalised with the fall of the Hungarian People's Republic. Permissive government policies soon propelled the country to the forefront of the European pornography industry. Several foreign directors were attracted to the country's liberal legislation. Eventually, domestic producers began to prosper as well, and several actresses became prominent within the industry.

History
During the communist era, pornography was considered a product of Western decadence, and was illegal. The laws were liberalised with the fall of the Hungarian People's Republic.

Characteristics
Pornography produced in Hungary is distinct from the more widespread U.S. pornography in several ways. A number of young women tried to seek their fortune in the capital. As the highly successful performer Mya Diamond says: "I come from a small village. I wanted to flee poverty and help my brothers and my mother financially." This results in women appearing much more natural than their U.S. counterparts, with the absence of most forms of body modification, like surgical enhancement, tattoos or piercings.

Producers and performers

The pioneers within the Hungarian pornography industry were foreign producers who were attracted to the country because of the favourable economic conditions and the steady supply of attractive female performers. The French actor and director Christoph Clark claims to have been the first, when he moved to Budapest as early as 1991. 

Initially, female performers were relatively anonymous; they were identified only by first name and normally used only for a few movies. The production companies wanted to avoid name recognition, in order to keep wages at a low level. Gradually, however, certain performers started to emerge as stars with a following among viewers. Because of the international distribution of films shot in Hungary, most performers choose internationally sounding screen names, such as Nikki Anderson (Swedish), Monique Covét (French) or Michelle Wild (English). Wild, whose real name is Katalin Vad, managed to cross over into mainstream stardom, and became an actress on the television soap opera Jóban rosszban.

See also

Pornography in Europe
Prostitution in Hungary

References

Sources

Hungary
Mass media in Hungary
Pornography in Europe